Andriy Artym (born 21 February 2000) is a professional Ukrainian football goalkeeper who plays for Ahrobiznes Volochysk.

Team career
Artym is the product of the Karpaty Lviv Youth School System.

He was promoted to the senior squad in November 2019 and made his debut for FC Karpaty playing a full-time home losing game against FC Olimpik Donetsk on 24 November 2019 in the Ukrainian Premier League.

International career
In October 2018, Artym was called up to the Ukraine national under-19 football team, but did not make a debut.

References

External links

2000 births
Living people
Sportspeople from Lviv
Ukrainian footballers
FC Karpaty Lviv players
FC Ahrobiznes Volochysk players
Association football goalkeepers
Ukrainian Premier League players
Ukrainian First League players